Mount Bartlett is a mountain 3 nautical miles (6 km) southeast of Mount Storer, in the Tula Mountains in Enderby Land. It was plotted from air photos taken from ANARE (Australian National Antarctic Research Expeditions) aircraft in 1956 and 1957. It was named by the Antarctic Names Committee of Australia (ANCA) for A.J. Bartlett, a member of the crew of the Discovery during the British Australian New Zealand Antarctic Research Expedition (BANZARE) of 1929–31.

Mountains of Enderby Land